The following is a timeline of the history of the city of Gijón, Spain.

Prior to 20th century

 844 - Gijón successfully resisted a Norman raid.
 1395 - Gijón was burned down.
 1560 - Gijón city archives active (approximate date).
 1721 -  built.
 1797 -  founded.
 1842 - Population: 16,558.
 1865 -  built.
 1878 - El Comercio newspaper begins publication.
 1888 - El Bibio bullring opens.
 1884 - Establishment of railway communications.
 1892 - El Musel port opens.
 1900 – Population: 47,544.

20th century

 1905 - Sporting de Gijón is founded.
 1930 - Population: 78,239.
 1940 - Population: 101,341.
 1955 - The construction of the Universidad Laboral finished.
 1981 - Population: 255,969.
 1982 - Part of 1982 FIFA World Cup football contest held in Gijón, including the controversial match between West Germany and Austria.
 1987 - Vicente Álvarez Areces becomes mayor.
 1992 - Palacio de Deportes opens.
 1999 -  becomes mayor.

21st century

 2003 -  (botanical garden) founded.
 2011
 Carmen Moriyón becomes mayor.
 Population: 276,969.
 2019: Ana González becomes mayor.

Evolution of the Gijón map

19th century

20th century

21st century

See also
 

Other cities in the autonomous community of Asturias:(es)
 Timeline of Oviedo
 List of municipalities in Asturias

References

This article incorporates information from the Asturian Wikipedia and Spanish Wikipedia.

Bibliography

External links

 Items related to Gijón, various dates (via Europeana)

Gijón
Gijon